Gudelj is a Bosnian, Croatian and Serbian surname. 

It may refer to:

 Bruno Gudelj (born 1966), Croatian handball player
 Dragiša Gudelj (born 1997), Serbian footballer
 Gabriela Gudelj (born 1997), Croatian handballer
 Hrvatin Gudelj (born 1978), Croatian footballer
 Ivan Gudelj (born 1960), Croatian footballer
 Nebojša Gudelj (born 1968), Serbian retired footballer
 Nemanja Gudelj (born 1991), Serbian footballer
 Vladimir Gudelj (born 1966), Bosnian retired footballer

References

Surnames
Croatian surnames
Bosnian surnames
Serbian surnames